The South African table of precedence is a nominal and symbolic hierarchy of important positions within the Republic of South Africa. It has no legal standing but is used to dictate ceremonial protocol at events of a national nature.

No date of issuance was known to the public, but the present table was amended on 1 January 1996.

Table of precedence 
South African Official Table of Precedence is as follows:

References 

Politics of South Africa
Government of South Africa